Close to You is the eleventh studio album by American musician Frank Sinatra, accompanied by the Hollywood String Quartet.

The album was recorded over a period of eight months and five different sessions, and was arranged by Nelson Riddle.

Nelson Riddle commented that the structure of popular songs does not lend itself to arranging in the true string quartet style of the classics and felt that he hadn't really achieved as much as he had hoped. However, when the album was released it received critical praise and as Riddle remarked, "Sinatra liked it!".

For its CD release, the album was retitled Close to You and More, referencing the bonus tracks.

Track listing
"Close to You" (Al Hoffman, Carl G. Lampl, Jerry Livingston) – 3:37
"P.S. I Love You" (Gordon Jenkins, Johnny Mercer) – 4:21
"Love Locked Out" (Max Kester, Ray Noble) – 2:41
"Everything Happens to Me" (Tom Adair, Matt Dennis) – 3:20
"It's Easy to Remember (And So Hard to Forget)" (Richard Rodgers, Lorenz Hart) – 3:34
"Don't Like Goodbyes" (Harold Arlen, Truman Capote) – 4:51
"With Every Breath I Take" (Ralph Rainger, Leo Robin) – 3:38
"Blame It on My Youth" (Edward Heyman, Oscar Levant) – 2:58
"It Could Happen to You" (Johnny Burke, Jimmy Van Heusen) – 3:13
"I've Had My Moments" (Walter Donaldson, Gus Kahn) – 3:47
"I Couldn't Sleep a Wink Last Night" (Harold Adamson, Jimmy McHugh) – 3:25
"The End of a Love Affair" (Edward Redding) – 4:11
 CD reissue bonus tracks not included on the original 1957 release:
"If It's the Last Thing I Do" (Sammy Cahn, Saul Chaplin) – 4:00
"There's a Flaw in My Flue" (Burke, Van Heusen) – 2:41
"Wait till You See Her" (Rodgers, Hart) – 3:08

Selected personnel
 Frank Sinatra – vocals
 Nelson Riddle – arranger, conductor
The Hollywood String Quartet:
 Felix Slatkin – violin, leader
 Paul Shure – violin
 Eleanor Aller – cello
 Alvin Dinkin – viola
 Harry Edison - trumpet
 Vincent DeRosa - horn
 Mahlon Clark - clarinet
 Harry Klee or James Williamson - flute
 Kathryn Julye - harp
 Bill Miler - piano/celeste

References

Frank Sinatra albums
Capitol Records albums
1957 albums
Albums produced by Voyle Gilmore
Albums arranged by Nelson Riddle
Albums conducted by Nelson Riddle
Albums recorded at Capitol Studios